"Girl" was the final single released from the Time's debut album.  Like most of the album, the song was recorded in Prince's home studio in April 1981, and was produced, arranged, composed and performed by Prince with Morris Day later adding his lead vocals. The single reached number 49 on the U.S. R&B singles chart.

The tender ballad is built around the piano and synthesizers and features live drumming and bass.  The emotional lyrics delivered by Day tell of a difficult breakup and that he is still in love with the song's subject.  Prince's backing vocals are unmistakable, especially in the chorus.

The U.S. 7" single was backed with an edit of album track, "The Stick", a funky number which was written by Revolution member Lisa Coleman (uncredited), who also provided background vocals.  Another uncredited Revolution member was Doctor Fink, who provided synthesizer solos for the track.  A 12" single was not released.

Though not one of their biggest hits, "Girl" is often played in concert and a live version of the song recorded at the House of Blues in 1998 and was included on Morris Day's 2004 album, It's About Time.

Prince wrote a completely different song entitled "Girl" in 1985, which became the B-side of the "America" single in the U.S. and the B-side of "Pop Life" in Europe (both released in 1985).

The Time (band) songs
1982 singles
Songs written by Prince (musician)
Song recordings produced by Prince (musician)
1982 songs
Warner Records singles
Contemporary R&B ballads